Denmark competed at the 1984 Winter Paralympics in held in Innsbruck, Austria. Five competitors from Denmark did not win any medals and so finished last in the medal table.

Four athletes (two men, two women) competed in cross-country skiing and one male athlete competed in alpine skiing.

Alpine skiing 

Lars Lauridsen competed at four events in alpine skiing:

 Men's Alpine Combination LW2
 Men's Giant Slalom LW2
 Men's Slalom LW2'
 Men's Downhill LW2

Cross-country 

The following athletes competed at cross-country skiing:

 Arne Christensen
 Else Hansen
 Michael Hansen
 Inger Joergensen

See also 

 Denmark at the Paralympics
 Denmark at the 1984 Summer Paralympics

References 

Denmark at the Paralympics
1984 in Danish sport
Nations at the 1984 Winter Paralympics